Geetaa Mera Naam is a 1974 Indian Hindi-language produced by R. K. Nayyar. His wife Sadhana starred in a dual role and also directed the film. The film also features Sunil Dutt, Feroz Khan and Helen. The music is by Laxmikant-Pyarelal. The film performed well in the box office.

Plot 
The film tells the story of four children who are separated at a fair and unknowingly reunite years later when Geeta (Sadhana) meets Neeta (also Sadhana) in prison. Neeta has been wrongly accused of murder. Geeta is then caught up in a scheme to find the true killer, which leads her to her brother Johny's (Sunil Dutt) gang.

During the early 1970s, Sunil Dutt's career as an actor was at a stand-still. Geetaa Mera Naam brought him into the limelight again. The anti-hero was reborn after a long gap of  films like Mother India and Mujhe Jeene Do. Sunil Dutt's performance of Johny was liked by the masses as he clearly stole the limelight. It was one of the best performances of his career.

Cast 
Sunil Dutt as Suraj / Johny
Feroz Khan as Raja
Sadhana as Kavita / Neeta / Geeta (Dual Role)
Helen as Savitri

Soundtrack 
The soundtrack was composed by Laxmikant-Pyarelal. The song "Mujhe Maar Daalo" with non-lexical vocable of this film was used in the song "People" which features in American rapper J Dilla's album Donuts (2006).

References

External links 
 

1974 films
1970s Hindi-language films
Films scored by Laxmikant–Pyarelal
1974 directorial debut films